Kirchhaslach is a municipality in the district of Unterallgäu in Bavaria, Germany. The town has a municipal association with Babenhausen, Bavaria.

Buildings

References

 

Unterallgäu